The 1st Senate District of Wisconsin is one of 33 districts in the Wisconsin State Senate.  Located in northeast Wisconsin, the district comprises all of Door and Kewaunee counties, as well as most of northern Manitowoc County, much of south and east Brown County, northern Calumet County, and part of southwest Outagamie County.  It includes the city of Two Rivers, most of the city of De Pere, and parts of the cities of Appleton and Menasha.  The district does not contain, but is adjacent to, the Green Bay area.

Current elected officials
André Jacque is the senator representing the 1st district. He was first elected in the 2018 general election, after losing an earlier bid for the seat in a June 2018 special election.  He previously served 8 years in the Wisconsin State Assembly, representing the 2nd Assembly district.

Each Wisconsin State Senate district is composed of three Wisconsin State Assembly districts.  The 1st Senate district comprises the 1st, 2nd, and 3rd Assembly districts.  The current representatives of those districts are:
 Assembly District 1: Joel Kitchens (R–Sturgeon Bay)
 Assembly District 2: Shae Sortwell (R–Two Rivers)
 Assembly District 3: Ron Tusler (R–Appleton)

The district is located within Wisconsin's 8th congressional district, which is represented by U.S. Representative Mike Gallagher.

Past senators

Note: the boundaries of districts have changed over history. Previous politicians of a specific numbered district have represented a different geographic area, due to redistricting.

At Wisconsin statehood, the Senate had only 19 districts. The 1st District consisted of Brown, Calumet, Manitowoc and Sheboygan counties.

For the 1853 session, the Senate was expanded to 25 members, and the 1st District lost Brown County.

For the 1857 session, the Senate was again expanded, to 30 members, and the District was reduced to Sheboygan County alone (the rest of the district became the new 19th District).

As of 1862, the Senate expanded to 33 seats, a size it would retain well into the 21st century; the 1st District remained unchanged.

The Senate was totally redistricted in 1876; Sheboygan County was now part of the 20th Senate District (along with part of Fond du Lac County). The new 1st District was made up of Door Kewaunee, Oconto and Shawano counties, which had previously been part of the 2nd and 8th Districts.

Kewaunee and Shawano counties were removed from the district in 1888.  Kewaunee was later re-added and Oconto removed in 1892—this district remained consistent for thirty years.

In 1922, the district moved to roughly its present boundaries when Marinette was removed and Manitowoc county was re-added.  This district was stable for fifty years.

From 1972 to 2012 the district has been edited 6 times adding and removing small portions of Brown, Calumet, Fond du Lac, Manitowoc, and Outagamie counties.

See also
Political subdivisions of Wisconsin

Notes

Wisconsin State Senate districts
Door County, Wisconsin
Calumet County, Wisconsin
Kewaunee County, Wisconsin
1848 establishments in Wisconsin